Anthony "Champ" Kelly (born 1980) is an American football executive who is the assistant general manager for the Las Vegas Raiders of the National Football League (NFL). He previously served as the assistant director of player personnel for the Chicago Bears from 2017 to 2021 and the director of pro scouting from 2015 to 2016. Prior to joining the Bears in 2015, Kelly was a member of the Denver Broncos. Additionally, he has worked with the Kentucky Horsemen of the United Indoor Football (UIF) as a general manager, coach, and player.

Executive career

Lexington Horsemen
Kelly was a player from 2003 to 2006, as a well as coach and general manager in 2007.  Under Kelly's leadership, the Horsemen won the Indoor Bowl IV in 2004 and were runner-up in United Bowl II and United Bowl III.

Denver Broncos
Kelly was hired by the Broncos in 2007 as a Northeast College scout, eventually working his way up to the position of Assistant Director of Pro Personnel.

Chicago Bears
Kelly joined the Chicago Bears in 2015 as the team's director of pro scouting. He was promoted to Assistant Director of Player Personnel in 2017. His main responsibilities are grading the top 100 draft prospects, leading the team's efforts in free agency, and advance scouting. In 2019, Kelly was a candidate in the New York Jets' general manager search, in November 2020 he was candidate for the Atlanta Falcons job and in January 2021 he was interviewed for the Denver Broncos GM Position.

Las Vegas Raiders 
On February 2, 2022, Kelly was named Assistant General Manager of the Las Vegas Raiders.

Personal life
Kelly is married to his wife, Stephanie, and they have three daughters. He is a native of Campbellton, Florida. He attended the University of Kentucky on a football scholarship, where he played wide receiver and defensive back for the football team from 1998 to 2001. Kelly is active in the community and founded a non-profit corporation, Heart Power, which has hosted youth programs in Illinois, Colorado, Florida, and Kentucky. He graduated from Kentucky with a master's degree in business administration and a bachelor's degree in computer science. Kelly worked for IBM as a software/quality engineer from 2002 to 2005.

References

Further references

External links
 Las Vegas Raiders profile

1980 births
Living people
Chicago Bears executives
Denver Broncos executives
Denver Broncos scouts
American football defensive backs
American football wide receivers
Kentucky Wildcats football players
Las Vegas Raiders executives
Lexington Horsemen players
People from Jackson County, Florida
Players of American football from Florida